Vice president of Cyprus is the second highest political position in Cyprus, after the president of Cyprus.
Under the 1960 constitution, the vice presidency is reserved for a Turkish Cypriot, while the presidency conversely is reserved for a Greek Cypriot. However, the Turkish Cypriots have not participated in the government since December 1963, and the post has been vacant since 1974.

Additionally under the 1960 constitution, three of the ministerial posts are reserved for Turkish Cypriots, and to be appointed by the vice president.

History
After independence from British colonial rule in 1960, the offices of president and vice president were established. Fazıl Küçük became the first vice president, running unopposed in the 1959 election and winning reelection in the 1968 election. Rauf Denktaş ran unopposed in the 1973 election, becoming the second vice president.

Vice president Denktaş, along with president Makarios III, was deposed by the Greek junta in a coup on 15 July 1974. While Makarios would eventually be restored to power, Denktaş would not, and the vice presidency has been vacant since. Turkey invaded Cyprus five days later, seizing northern parts of the island and later turning it into the Turkish Republic of Northern Cyprus (TRNC). Later the same year, Denktaş would become president of the TRNC's predecessor, continuing as president of Northern Cyprus until 2005.

List
History of the office holders follows.

See also
The Annan Plan, which proposed that there should be a president and vice president, one Greek Cypriot and one Turkish Cypriot, rotating posts twice during a five-year term.

References

Government of Cyprus
Cyprus
 
1960 establishments in Cyprus